Ann Killion is an American sports journalist and author. She has written for Sports Illustrated, San Francisco Chronicle, Comcast Sportsnet, San Jose Mercury News, and Los Angeles Times. She is the co-author of two books with Olympic gold medalists: Throw Like a Girl: How to Dream Big & Believe in Yourself with Jennie Finch and Solo: A Memoir of Hope with Hope Solo.

Early life and education
Killion was raised in Mill Valley, California and has two brothers, Paul and Tom Killion. She attended Tamalpais High School where she was the sports editor for the school newspaper. She completed her college degree at UCLA and obtained her Master's Degree in Journalism from Columbia University.

Works
 Throw Like a Girl: How to Dream Big & Believe in Yourself. By Jennie Finch and Ann Killion. Location: 2011.
 Solo: A Memoir of Hope. By Hope Solo and Ann Killion. Location: 2012.

References

External links
 
 San Francisco Chronicle biography

Living people
American sports journalists
American women sportswriters
Tamalpais High School alumni
University of California, Los Angeles alumni
Columbia University Graduate School of Journalism alumni
Sportswriters from California
San Francisco Chronicle people
21st-century American women writers
American women non-fiction writers
21st-century American non-fiction writers
Year of birth missing (living people)